The Certificate of Use of Language in Spanish, or CELU (Spanish: Certificado de Español: Lengua y Uso), is an exam designed to determine the level of proficiency in the Argentinian Spanish language. The exam can be taken by anyone whose mother language is not Spanish and needs to demonstrate he has a certain level of proficiency of the language, whether it is for working or studying, in Spanish-speaking countries. The exam is required by universities in Argentina for foreigners and it is also accepted as a valid exam in Brazil and China.

Candidates
Any person whose mother language is not Spanish can take this exam. They must be at least 16 years of age and certify a minimum three years of high school education (EGB III according to the current educational system in Argentina, roughly someone who has just passed to the 12th grade in the American system).

Passing the exam fulfills the language requirements for studying or working in Argentina where knowledge of Spanish is a requirement.

Grading
There are two "pass" grades, either "Intermediate" or "Advanced" level, awarded to candidates who achieve these grades. Candidates who do not pass are not given a grade. Both grades reflect how proficient the person is in the use of Spanish as a foreign language, especially in dealing with everyday situations and work related or academic issues.

This exam is aimed at certifying a certain level of command of the language, therefore, regardless of the regional variation a candidate may know, they will be able to understand the situations to be dealt with in the exam.

Acceptance
The CELU is recognized as a certificate which demonstrates a persons knowledge of the Spanish language in:
 Argentina
 Brazil
 China
 Italy

Parts of the Exam

Dates
Exams are taken in June and November. Application is opened three months prior to the examination dates and remains open for about one month.

Exam venues
In Argentina:

Buenos Aires
Córdoba
La Pampa
La Plata
Mar del Plata
Quilmes
Río Cuarto
San Luis
San Martín
Santa Fe
Tandil
San Fernando del Valle de Catamarca
Paraná, Entre Ríos

In Brazil:

Brasília
Campinas
Curitiba
Rio de Janeiro
São Paulo
Porto Alegre
Santa Maria

In Germany:
Berlin
In  France:
Paris
In  Russia:
Moscow

University Consortium for the Evaluation of Knowledge and Use of Spanish as a Second Language
The following Universities are currently part of the Consortium:

Universidad de Buenos Aires
Universidad Nacional de Catamarca
Universidad Nacional del Centro de la Provincia de Buenos Aires
Universidad Nacional del Comahue
Universidad Nacional de Córdoba
Universidad Nacional de La Pampa
Universidad Nacional de La Plata
Universidad Nacional del Litoral
Universidad de Lomas de Zamora
Universidad Nacional de Mar del Plata
Universidad Nacional de Quilmes
Universidad Nacional de Río Cuarto
Universidad Nacional de Río Negro
Universidad Nacional de San Luis
Universidad Nacional de General San Martín
Universidad Nacional de Villa María
Universidad Nacional de Entre Ríos
Universidad Nacional de Tucumán

See also
 Spanish as a Second Language

External links
 CELU Official Website
Nota publicada en Clarín el 15 de noviembre de 2004
Nota publicada en La Nación el 14 de febrero de 2006 
Nota publicada en La Nación el 6 de abril de 2004

Spanish language tests
Education in Argentina
Spanish as a second or foreign language